The 2017 Ligas Superiores, the fifth division of Peruvian football (soccer), will be played by variable number teams by Departament.

Liga Superior de Piura
Two groups of three teams played home and away matches. The top two teams in each group moved on to the semifinals.

First stage

Group A

Group B

Second stage

San Antonio and Juana & Victor advanced to the Departamental Stage.

Liga Superior de Tumbes
Comercial Aguas Verdes made its debut on the tournament. Cristal Tumbes and Los Chanos were relegated for lack of resources. The team with the fewest points was relegated back to their District League of origin.

References

2017
5